A state space is a discrete space considered in computer science.

It may also refer to:
 State space (dynamical and control systems)
 State space (physics)
 State-space representation